Sian Brooke (born Sian Elizabeth Phillips; born 1980) is a British actress. Her television work includes Cape Wrath (2007), Sherlock (2017), Doctor Foster (2017), Good Omens (2019), Guilt (2019), and Trying (2020–).

Early life and education
Sian Elizabeth Phillips was born in Lichfield, Staffordshire, England in 1980 and is the youngest of three siblings. She took on a stage name to avoid confusion with fellow actress Siân Phillips, choosing Brooke after an English Civil War general Lord Brooke who was killed at Lichfield. She is the daughter of a police officer and a teacher. Her parents are Welsh.  Brooke's early education was at The Friary School in Lichfield. She initially joined the Lichfield Youth Theatre at the age of 11 before becoming a member of the National Youth Theatre and subsequently training at the Royal Academy of Dramatic Art (RADA), from where she graduated in 2002.

Career
Her acting debut was as Krista in television series Dinotopia in 2002.
Brooke's television credits include A Touch of Frost, Hotel Babylon, Foyle's War, and The Fixer. As a child, she was featured in Strangers in Utah with Adrian Dunbar and Phyllida Law. She also played the lead roles of Laura in All About George and Lori Marcuse in Cape Wrath.

Brooke has lent her voice to the radio dramas Murder on the Homefront, A Pin to See the Peepshow, and Dreaming in Africa.

Brooke's theatre work includes Harvest, Dying City, Dido Queen of Carthage, In The Club, The Birthday Party, and Absolutely Perhaps. She has also appeared in productions of Poor Beck, A Midsummer Night's Dream, King Lear and Romeo and Juliet, with the Royal Shakespeare Company. From July to August 2008, Brooke played Dorothy Gale in the musical The Wizard of Oz at the Southbank Centre. The production was directed by Jude Kelly. During 2011 at the Almeida Theatre, London, she appeared in Stephen Poliakoff's My City and Neil LaBute's Reasons to be Pretty. From August to October 2015, Brooke played Ophelia alongside Benedict Cumberbatch in the Barbican's production of Hamlet.

In 2017, Brooke starred in the fourth season of television crime drama Sherlock as Sherlock Holmes' secret sister, Eurus. She initially auditioned for multiple characters in the show before the showrunners told Brooke that all the characters were one, Eurus, who would be a master of disguise. Michael Hogan writing for The Daily Telegraph in his review of the third episode of the season commented that the role was "a star-making turn from Sian Brooke". Later in the year, she appeared with Sheridan Smith and Gemma Whelan in the BBC miniseries The Moorside, based on the kidnapping of Shannon Matthews. She starred as Karen in the first two seasons of Apple TV series Trying, which has been renewed for a third season.

Personal life
Brooke is married and has two children. She is an ambassador for the climate change adaptation charity The Glacier Trust.

Filmography

Television

Film

Stage

References

External links
 

People from Lichfield
Actors from Staffordshire
English people of Welsh descent
Alumni of RADA
British television actresses
British stage actresses
British musical theatre actresses
British radio actresses
British Shakespearean actresses
Royal Shakespeare Company members
1980 births
Living people
21st-century British actresses
National Youth Theatre members
Climate activists